The Xianbei state  or Xianbei confederation was a nomadic empire which existed in modern-day Mongolia, Inner Mongolia, northern Xinjiang, Northeast China, Gansu, Buryatia, Zabaykalsky Krai, Irkutsk Oblast, Tuva, Altai Republic and eastern Kazakhstan from 156 to 234. Like most ancient peoples known through Chinese historiography, the ethnic makeup of the Xianbei is unclear.

History

Origin
When the Donghu "Eastern Barbarians" were defeated by Modu Chanyu around 208 BC, the Donghu splintered into the Xianbei and Wuhuan. According to the Book of the Later Han, “the language and culture of the Xianbei are the same as the Wuhuan”.

The first significant contact the Xianbei had with the Han dynasty was in 41 and 45 when they joined the Wuhuan and Xiongnu in raiding Han territory.

In 49, the governor Ji Tong convinced the Xianbei chieftain Pianhe to turn on the Xiongnu with rewards for each Xiongnu head they collected. In 54, Yuchouben and Mantou of the Xianbei paid tribute to Emperor Guangwu of Han. In 58, Pianhe attacked and killed Xinzhiben, a Wuhuan leader causing trouble in Yuyang Commandery.

In 85, the Xianbei secured an alliance with the Dingling and Southern Xiongnu.

In 87, the Xianbei attacked the Xiongnu chanyu Youliu and killed him. They stripped the skin off of him and his followers and took the skin back with them as trophies.

Confederation
After the downfall of the Xiongnu, the Xianbei replaced them with a loose confederacy from AD 93.

Qizhijian became the first great war-leader of the Xianbei in 121. From 121 until his death in 133, the Xianbei made regular raids on Han territory. In 145, the Xianbei raided Dai Commandery.

Around 155, the northern Xiongnu were "crushed and subjugated" by the Xianbei. The Xianbei chief, known by the Chinese as Tanshihuai, then advanced upon and defeated the Wusun of the Ili region by 166. Under Tanshihuai, the Xianbei extended their territory from the Ussuri to the Caspian Sea. He divided the Xianbei empire into three sections, each ruled by twenty clans. Tanshihuai then formed an alliance with the southern Xiongnu to attack Shaanxi and Gansu. China successfully repulsed their attacks in 158. In 177 AD, Xia Yu, Tian Yan and the Tute Chanyu led a force of 30,000 against the Xianbei. They were defeated and returned with only a quarter of their original forces. A memorial made that year records that the Xianbei had taken all the lands previously held by the Xiongnu and their warriors numbered 100,000. Han deserters who sought refuge in their lands served as their advisers and refined metals as well as wrought iron came into their possession. Their weapons were sharper and their horses faster than those of the Xiongnu. Another memorial submitted in 185 states that the Xianbei were making raids on Han settlements nearly every year. The Xianbei might have also attacked Wa (Japan) with some success.

Decline
The loose Xianbei confederacy lacked the organization of the Xiongnu but was highly aggressive until the death of their khan Tanshihuai in 182. Tanshihuai's son Helian lacked his father's abilities and was killed in a raid on Beidi in 186. Helian's brother Kuitou succeeded him, but when Helian's son Qianman came of age, he challenged his uncle to succession, destroying the last vestiges of unity among the Xianbei. Qianman was unsuccessful and disappeared soon after. By 190, the Xianbei had split into three groups with Kuitou ruling in Inner Mongolia, Kebineng in northern Shanxi, and Suli and Mijia in northern Liaodong. In 205, Kuitou's brothers Budugen and Fuluohan succeeded him. After Cao Cao defeated the Wuhuan at the Battle of White Wolf Mountain in 207, Budugen and Fuluohan paid tribute to him. In 218, Fuluohan met with the Wuhuan chieftain Nengchendi to form an alliance, but Nengchendi double crossed him and called in another Xianbei khan, Kebineng, who killed Fuluohan. Budugen went to the court of Cao Wei in 224 to ask for assistance against Kebineng, but he eventually betrayed them and allied with Kebineng in 233. Kebineng killed Budugen soon afterwards.

Kebineng was from a minor Xianbei tribe. He rose to power west of Dai Commandery by taking in a number of Chinese refugees, who helped him drill his soldiers and make weapons. After the defeat of the Wuhuan in 207, he also sent tribute to Cao Cao, and even provided assistance against the rebel Tian Yin. In 218 he allied himself to the Wuhuan rebel Nengchendi but they were heavily defeated and forced back across the frontier by Cao Zhang. In 220 he acknowledged Cao Pi as emperor of Cao Wei. Eventually he turned on Cao Wei for frustrating his advances on another Xianbei khan, Sui, and he launched raids on Cao Wei's territory. Kebineng was ultimately assassinated by Cao Wei in 235, after which his confederacy disintegrated.

Later history
After the fall of the last khans, Budugen and Kebineng, in 234, the Xianbei state splintered into a number of smaller independent domains. The third century saw both the fragmentation of the Xianbei state in 235 and the branching out of the various Xianbei tribes later to establish significant empires of their own. The most prominent branches were the Murong, Tuoba, Khitan people, Shiwei and Rouran Khaganate.

Xianbei peoples subsequently moved south of the Great Wall of China and exerted considerable influence during the Sixteen Kingdoms (304–439), Northern Dynasties (386–581), Sui Dynasty (581–618), and Tang Dynasty (618–907). Most notably, ethnically Xianbei monarchs ruled several of the Northern Dynasties, including the Northern Wei, Western Wei (535–556), and Northern Zhou (557–581).

The Khitan people, who founded the Liao dynasty (916–1125) in Northeast Asia, were included among the Yuwen Xianbei of southern Mongolia, who had earlier founded the Western Wei and Northern Zhou. The Khitan-ruled Liao Dynasty gave rise to the use of "Cathay" as a name for China in the Persianate world and medieval Europe.  

The Mongols derived their ancestry from the Mengwu Shiwei of Inner Mongolia and northeastern Mongolia, where Shiwei is a variant transcription for Xianbei.

Culture
The economic base of the Xianbei was animal husbandry combined with agricultural practice. They were the first to develop the khanate system, in which formation of social classes deepened, and developments also occurred in their literacy, arts and culture. They used a zodiac calendar and favoured song and music. Tengrism and subsequently Buddhism were the main religions among the Xianbei people. After they abandoned the frigid north and migrated into Northern China, they gradually abandoned nomadic lifestyle and were sinicized and assimilated with the Han Chinese. Emperor Xiaowen of the Xianbei-led state of Northern Wei in northern China, eventually decreed the changes of Xianbei names to Han names.

Rulers 
 Bianhe/Pianhe 偏和 (49)
 Yuchouben 於仇賁 (54)
 Mantou 滿頭 (54)
 Wulun 烏倫 (120)
 Qizhiqian 其至鞬
 Tanshihuai 檀石槐 (130–181)
 Helian 和連 (181–185)
 Kuitou 魁頭 (185–187)
 Qianman 騫曼 (190s)
 Budugen 步度根 (187–234)
 Kebineng 軻比能 (190s–235)

See also

References

Citations

Sources

External links
The Routes of TanShiHuai's campaigns in 156-178 AD

 
Former countries in Chinese history
History of Mongolia
Inner Asia
Nomadic groups in Eurasia
States and territories established in the 90s
States and territories disestablished in the 3rd century
230s disestablishments
Former empires
Former confederations